Family Feud Canada is an English-language Canadian game show based on the American game show. It is hosted by actor and comedian Gerry Dee. On May 29, 2019, it was announced that an English-speaking version would air on CBC Television, produced by Zone3, and distributed by Fremantle North America, starting on December 16, 2019.

Game play is the same as the concurrent U.S. version. As of December 30, 2019, there is a limit of three appearances (unlike the U.S. version, where a family can appear up to five times and also win a car after their fifth and final win). Music score is the same as in U.S. original and studio set is nearly identical to the current one used in U.S. version of Family Feud, but have some differences. Each winning family from the first month would return following the three-day limit change.

All family members must be at least 18 years old, compared to the U.S. version, in which they don't have a fixed age requirement.  (The U.S. version still recommends that the contestants be at least 15 years old, due to the nature of the questions.)

In February 2020, the show was renewed for a second season by CBC. The second season began airing on October 12, 2020. It was also renewed for a third and upcoming fourth season.

The show covers costs for the contestants to travel to Toronto for game sessions. Among the game's rules are that contestants cannot boo other contestants.

References

External links
Family Feud Canada

Family Feud
2010s Canadian game shows
2019 Canadian television series debuts
2020s Canadian game shows
Television series by Fremantle (company)
Television shows filmed in Toronto
CBC Television original programming
Television productions suspended due to the COVID-19 pandemic
Canadian television series based on American television series